Robregordo is a municipality of the Community of Madrid, Spain.

Public transport 
The only way to arrive Robregordo are with the following bus lines: 

Line 191. Madrid (Plaza de Castilla) - Buitrago del Lozoya

Line 191B. Buitrago del Lozoya - Somosierra

Until 2011 the village had a station named Robregordo-Somosierra (although it didn’t gave service to Somosierra), however, a landslide in the nearby Somosierra tunnel, added to the poor state of the infrastructure for years, caused the train service to be permanently suspended.

External links

Municipalities in the Community of Madrid